Hadena magnolii is a species of moth of the  family Noctuidae. It is found in Morocco, Algeria, south-eastern Europe, Turkey, Israel and Lebanon, Iran, Turkmenistan, Uzbekistan and Kirghizia.

Description
Warren states H. magnolii Bdv. (= nummosa Er., conspurcata H. Sch. ?) (18 e). Forewing olive fuscous, somewhat purplish-tinged, and dusted with white; lines black, edged with bluish-white ; claviform stigma of ground colour, edged with black; orbicular round, white-ringed, distinct; reniform less clear, partially white-edged; hindwing fuscous, paler towards base, with dark cellspot and outer lne. Portugal, S. France, Italy, Switzerland,Dalmatia, Austria, Russia; Armenia, Asia Minor, W. Turkestan. Larva greyish yellow, darker at sides; dorsal line dark brown, geminate; the subdorsal stripes dark; lateral line pale; head yellow brown; on Silene nutans.

Subspecies
Hadena magnolii magnolii
Hadena magnolii fabiani

Biology
Adults are on wing from May to June. There is one generation per year.

The larvae feed on the flowers and seeds of Silene nutans and other Silene species.

References

External links
 Hadeninae of Israel

Hadena
Moths of Europe
Moths of Africa
Moths of Asia
Moths described in 1829